The 2014–15 season was Preston North End's 127th in the Football League. It was their fourth consecutive season in the third tier of English football, League One, following failure to be promoted by play-offs the previous season for the ninth time. The season ended with Preston being promoted to the Championship via the play-offs, following a 4–0 win over Swindon Town at Wembley Stadium.

Season overview
In his second summer in charge Simon Grayson signed 5 players permanently – Jamie Jones, Calum Woods, Jordan Hugill, Andy Little and Kyel Reid and brought Paul Gallagher in on a season long loan. Preston also signed Callum Robinson on a two-month youth loan in September and Jermaine Beckford on a season long loan in November.

Preston allowed 9 players to leave Deepdale during the summer, those being Chris Beardsley, Shane Cansdell-Sherriff, Ryan Croasdale, Graham Cummins, Iain Hume, John Mousinho, Alex Nicholson, Nicky Wroe and Stuart Beavon.

Preston started the season strongly, winning 2 and drawing 3 of the first five league games of the season. Preston suffered their first league loss of the season, against Walsall F.C. in their sixth game of the season. Of their next 8 games, Preston won 7 and drew 1. After their first 14 games, Preston were in 2nd place, on 31 points, two points behind league leaders Bristol City F.C., but 5 points clear of 3rd place Swindon Town F.C.

Preston then went on to lose their next 3 league games, against Rochdale, Swindon Town F.C. and Bradford City.

In the midst of the league campaign, Preston were involved in 3 separate cup competitions. Preston found success in the Football League Trophy, reaching the Northern section final – losing 2–0 on aggregate to Walsall. In the League Cup, Preston faced, and defeated Rochdale in round 1, before being beaten by Middlesbrough in the second round. In the opening 3 rounds of the FA Cup, Preston defeated Havant & Waterlooville in the first round, Shrewsbury Town in the second and Norwich City in the third round to put them in the hat for a potentially money-spinning trip to a Premier League side in the fourth round of the cup.

Meanwhile, in Preston's next 10 games, they won 4, drew 4 and lost 2 – although they did go on a 5 match winless run, culminating in a loss against Crawley Town. During this run, Preston also faced Sheffield United in the FA Cup in the fourth Round. They drew 1–1 in the first game, before winning 3–1 in the replay. This set up a fifth round home tie against Manchester United.

Following Preston securing a home tie in the FA Cup against Manchester United, they went on an 18-game unbeaten run, winning 12 and drawing 6 of those games, including notable wins against promotion rivals MK Dons and Swindon Town placed them in prime position for automatic promotion, needing to win against relegation threatened Colchester United on the final day. Preston lost the game 1–0, whilst MK Dons won, meaning that Preston finished the season in 3rd place and were in the play-offs again. Simon Grayson's side had been in the top two since the start of March and had not lost in the league since 31 January. They faced Chesterfield in the semifinals of the playoffs.

In the FA Cup, Preston lost 3–1 to Manchester United, despite taking the lead through Scott Laird. That was Preston's only defeat during their unbeaten run between January and May.

In the first leg of the playoffs, Preston won 1–0, thanks to a goal from Jermaine Beckford. In the second leg they won 3–0 thanks to Joe Garner's penalty and Jermaine Beckford's brace. They won the semifinals 4–0 on aggregate and set up a play off final against Swindon Town. Preston, who had never won in the playoffs in their previous nine appearances – which was a record at the time, beat Swindon Town 4–0 in the play-off final, including a hat-trick by Jermaine Beckford, winning promotion to the Championship.

Squad

Statistics

|-
|colspan=14|Players who have left the club:

|}

Play-off appearances

|}

Captains

Goals record

Disciplinary record

Contracts

Transfers

In

Loans in

Out

Loans out

Match details

Pre-season

League One

League table

Matches

Play-offs

FA Cup

League Cup

Football League Trophy

Overall summary

Summary

Score overview

Club staff

References

Preston North End F.C. seasons
Preston North End